Antonio Marziale (born September 28, 1997) is an American actor, best known for playing Elliot in the original Netflix movie Alex Strangelove. He also portrays the character of Benicio in Brian Jordan Alvarez's popular YouTube series, The Gay and Wondrous Life of Caleb Gallo.

Biography and career
Antonio Marziale was born in London, England. His father is Italian and his mother is from Toronto, Ontario, Canada. He attended The American School in Switzerland and attended Carnegie Mellon University when he was 16 years old.

In addition to his role in Alex Strangelove, in 2017 he starred as Daryn Boston in the 12th season episode "The Memory Remains" of the fantasy horror series Supernatural.

He plays Isaac Bancroft in Netflix's popular dystopic series Altered Carbon. 

In 2022, Marziale made his debut as a director and screenwriter in short film Starfuckers, which premiered at the 2022 Sundance Film Festival.

Filmography

References

External links 
 

1997 births
Living people
21st-century American male actors
American male film actors
American male television actors
American people of Canadian descent
Carnegie Mellon University alumni
Male actors from Pittsburgh
American gay actors